Marasmarcha lydia is a moth of the family Pterophoridae. It is found in Russia (Buryatia), Mongolia. and Tajikistan. The habitat consists of piedmont steppenfield meadows.

Adults are on wing in July.

The larvae probably feed on legumes.

References

Moths described in 1996
Exelastini